CNS is a mixture of chloroacetophenone, chloropicrin and chloroform that is used as a chemical warfare agent. CNS has the lachrymatory effects of chloroacetophenone and choking effects of chloropicrin. It has a flypaper-like odor.

CNS was used as a riot control agent, but it's no longer used now.

References

Chemical weapons
Lachrymatory agents
Chemical warfare agent mixtures